The Bay of Plenty by-election of 1941 was a by-election for the electorate of Bay of Plenty held on 13 December 1941 during the 26th New Zealand Parliament. The by-election resulted from the death of the previous member Gordon Hultquist of the Labour Party who was killed in World War II.

The by-election was won by Bill Sullivan of the National Party; Labour lost a seat.

Campaign
Initially there was speculation that there would be no election necessary and that the National Party would not stand a candidate after the death of an MP on service in wartime (as happened in the Waitemata by-election). This was not to be the case and National stood their candidate from the 1938 election and former Mayor of Whakatane Bill Sullivan.

The Labour Party selected Charles Mills, a baker, as their candidate. He was an elected member of the Poverty Bay Electric Power Board and had been a campaign organiser for Hultquist in Bay of Plenty in both the 1935 and 1938 elections.

The incipient Democratic Labour Party (DLP), who had recently formed a branch in the electorate in Opotiki, also contemplated standing a candidate. However the DLP did not contest the seat.

Results
The following table gives the election results:

References

Bay of Plenty 1941
1941 elections in New Zealand
Politics of the Bay of Plenty Region